Ferenc Münnich (18 November 1886 – 29 November 1967) was a Hungarian Communist politician who served as Chairman of the Council of Ministers of the People's Republic of Hungary from 1958 to 1961.

He served in the Austro-Hungarian Army in World War I, and fought in the Eastern front. He was captured in 1915, then deported to a lager in Tomsk, Siberia. In 1918, he was freed and returned to Hungary. He participated in the government of the 1919 Hungarian Soviet Republic.

He fought in the Spanish Civil War and was commissar of Rakosi Battalion of XIII International Brigade.

He joined the Hungarian Communist Party in October 1945. After World War II, he returned from exile and became a chief police superintendent of Budapest. In 1956 Hungarian Revolution, first he was officially part of the Imre Nagy government, serving as interior minister from 27 to 31 October, then fled to Soviet Union. He returned with János Kádár on 4 November 1956, serving as interior minister and defence minister in the "Revolutionary Worker-Peasant Government," holding these positions until 1 March 1957. A couple of months later, he organized the Worker's Militia. In 1965 and 1967, he was decorated with the Lenin award of the Soviet Union.

References

1886 births
1967 deaths
People from Fejér County
Hungarian people of German descent
Hungarian Communist Party politicians
Members of the Hungarian Working People's Party
Members of the Hungarian Socialist Workers' Party
Prime Ministers of Hungary
Hungarian Interior Ministers
Defence ministers of Hungary
Austro-Hungarian military personnel of World War I
Hungarian people of the Spanish Civil War
People of the Hungarian Revolution of 1956
International Brigades personnel